Simone Confalone is an Italian football (soccer) player who currently plays for S.P. La Fiorita in the Campionato Sammarinese di Calcio.

Club career

AC Cesena  –  F.C. Forlì 
Simone Confalone started his professional career with the youth system of A.C. Cesena in 1986. Before Confalone was promoted to the senior squad for Cesena, he was sold to F.C. Forlì in 1993. He only remained at the club for one season, making just 8 total appearances. He was sold in the summer of 1994 back to AC Cesena, but in a six-month spell, with his original club, he failed to make a single appearance, and was again transferred in January 1995.

Imolese Calcio
In January 1995, Confalone moved to Imolese Calcio 1919, where he would make 13 appearances, and score his first professional goal.

San Marino Calcio
After six months with Imola, Confalone moved to Serie C club, San Marino Calcio in the summer of 1995. He managed a single league goal in 8 total appearances for the club in which he remained only for a single season.

A.S.D. Cervia 1920
In the summer of 1996, Confalone transferred to A.S.D. Cervia 1920. the experience was again very short of expectations, as due to various injuries, and set backs, he managed just 11 total appearances in 3 years. He left the club in the summer of 1999.

A.S.D. Castel di Sangro Calcio
He then transferred to A.S.D. Castel di Sangro Calcio, after his poor experience with Cervia. In his first season with the club, he got off to a good start, and would go on to make over 50 total appearances, scoring 9 goals. He left the club after just two seasons however, to re-sign for A.C. Cesena, the club he represented at a youth and senior level in the past.

Return to Cesena
In July 2001, Canfalone transferred back to A.C. Cesena, after a good experience with A.S.D. Castel di Sangro Calcio. He finally managed to make his way into the club's first team and would go on to be one of the key players in their bids to at a time be promoted to the Serie B, and also look to both avoid relegation and/or be promoted to the Italian Serie A. He remained with the club until August 2005. This was the longest and most successful spell for the player, with a single club. He appeared nearly 150 times, scoring over 20 goals.

AC Arezzo
After his four-season stint with Cesena, Confalone moved to Tuscany, with A.C. Arezzo in 2005. The club was at the time in the Serie B. In his single season with the Tuscan club, Confalone established himself as a starter for much of the season. he formed a solid midfield partnership with Mirko Conte, and managed 38 appearances in all competitions as well as 3 goals.

Spezia Calcio
In August 2006, Canfalone was sold to Spezia Calcio, another Serie B club, following Arezzo's Relegation to Serie C1, now known as the Lega Pro Prima Divisione. With the club, Confalone was also part of the starting eleven for much of the season, and most notably scored a goal against Juventus FC, in a 1–1 draw at the Stadio Alberto Picco, in Spezia. He appeared 30 times for the club over the course of the season, scoring 2 other goals along the way. Despite not finishing in the bottom 4 in Serie B, Spezia were relegated anyway, due to financial purposes and eventual bankruptcy. Hence, Confalone left the club.

Bologna FC 1909
During the summer of 2007, Confalone moved to Bologna FC. At the time of his arrival, Bologna were in the Italian Serie B, however in his first season with the club, they achieved a second-place finish, leading to promotion to the Italian Serie A. Confalone helped contribute to their promotion with 19 total appearances and 1 goal. In his first ever season in Serie A, he was struck with injury for much of the campaign, only featuring 4 times throughout the season. His contract was not renewed and he was released on 30 June 2009.

Later career
On 4 November 2009, Confalone officially signed for Lega Pro Prima Divisione side, Ternana Calcio.  He appeared 14 times with 6 of them coming as a part of the starting XI. Ternana just barely missed out on a return to Serie B that season, and Confalone eventually departed the club in order to return to his former club, Imolese. His stay at the club was very brief however, and he transferred to Associazione Calcio Asti after just 11 appearances and 1 goal for Imolese. His stay at Asti proved even shorter than his previous cameo, as he made just 6 appearances, scoring once for the Asti based club. He then transferred to amateur side Pelli SantaCroce before returning to the professional stage with S.P. La Fiorita in the Campionato Sammarinese di Calcio.

References

1974 births
Living people
Sportspeople from Rimini
Italian footballers
Serie A players
Juventus F.C. players
Bologna F.C. 1909 players
A.S.D. Castel di Sangro Calcio players
Association football midfielders
Imolese Calcio 1919 players
Footballers from Emilia-Romagna